Smallpox Bay is a bay on the west side of San Juan Island in the U.S. state of Washington.

Smallpox Bay was named for the fact that a group of indigenous victims of the 1862 Pacific Northwest smallpox epidemic died there and their corpses burned by US officers.

References

Bodies of water of San Juan County, Washington
Bays of Washington (state)